Fred Aandahl may refer to:

Fred Aandahl (1887–1950), American architect of Sutton, Whitney & Aandahl
Fred G. Aandahl (1897–1966), American politician